Enzensberger is a German surname. Notable people with the surname include:

 Christian Enzensberger (1931–2009), German academic, writer and translator
 Hans Magnus Enzensberger (1929–2022), German writer, poet, translator, and editor
 Horst Enzensberger (born 1944), German historian
 Josef Enzensberger (1914–1975), German Luftwaffe pilot
 Marianne Enzensberger (born 1947), German actress 
 Theresia Enzensberger (born 1986), German journalist
 Ulrich Enzensberger (born 1944), German writer

German-language surnames

de:Enzensberger